Goudgeri is a village in Dharwad district of Karnataka, India.

Demographics 
As of the 2011 Census of India there were 557 households in Goudgeri and a total population of 2,903 consisting of 1,526 males and 1,377 females. There were 426 children ages 0-6.

References

Villages in Dharwad district